Goose Creek Wilderness is a  wilderness area in the US state of Utah.  It was designated March 30, 2009, as part of the Omnibus Public Land Management Act of 2009.  Located adjacent to the northern boundary of Zion National Park, it protects a portion of the upper reaches of Goose Creek, a tributary of the Wild and Scenic Virgin River.  Goose Creek Wilderness is bordered by the Zion Wilderness to the south.

See also
 List of U.S. Wilderness Areas
 Wilderness Act

References

External links
 Goose Creek Wilderness - Wilderness.net
 Map of wilderness areas in northeastern Washington County, Utah

Wilderness areas of Utah
Zion National Park
Protected areas of Washington County, Utah
Bureau of Land Management areas in Utah